The mixed team recurve competition at the 2022 European Archery Championships took place from 6 to 12 June in Munich, Germany.

Qualification round
Results after 144 arrows.

Final round

Elimination round
Source:

Section 1

Section 2

References

Recurve Mixed Team